Valga is a former Soviet air base in Estonia located in Jaanikese,  northeast of Valga. It was listed on the 1974 Department of Defense Global Navigation Chart No. 3 as having jet facilities. It has mostly been plowed under into farmland. It is only  from the Latvian border.

References

RussianAirFields.com

Soviet Air Force bases
Military installations of Estonia
Defunct airports in Estonia
Valga Parish
Buildings and structures in Valga County
Valga, Estonia